The term Bargello (ancient Barigello) derives from the medieval Latin barigildus, a term of Lombard origin (for the Goths bargi , for the Germans burg). Its meaning is "fortified tower" or "castle".

In the Middle Ages, bargello was the name attributed to the military captain in charge of maintaining order during periods of revolt, often having dictatorial functions as regent. The bargello, as Capitano di Giustizia or Capitano del popolo, was present in many cities of the Italian peninsula, particularly in Florence and in Rome.

The term bargello was taken by extension from the palace where the captain of justice was located and the prison were criminals were kept. In Florence the bargello was chosen among foreign people, calling them from another city, in the same way as the Podestà.

References

Sources
 
 
 
 

Italian city-states